Vahi (or Vähi) may refer to:

Places
Vahi, Tartu County, small borough in Tartu Parish, Tartu County, Estonia
Vahi village, Tartu County, village in Tartu Parish, Tartu County, Estonia
Vahi, Harju County, village in Harku Parish, Harju County, Estonia
Virginia Highland, neighborhood of Atlanta, Georgia, United States

People
Kristina Vähi (born 1973), Estonian operatic soprano
Peeter Vähi (born 1955), Estonian composer
Tiit Vähi (born 1947), Estonian businessman and politician
Kristina Šmigun-Vähi (born 1977), Estonian cross-country skier

Other
Vahi-vero, a character in Tuamotu mythology
 A Kanohi mask from the LEGO Bionicle series